= Charles M. Silver =

American lawyer

Charles M. Silver is an American lawyer, currently the Roy W. and Eugenia C. McDonald Endowed Chair in Civil Procedure, and previously the W. James Kronzer Chair and Cecil D. Redford Professor at University of Texas School of Law.

== Education ==
- JD Yale University
- MA University of Chicago
- BA University of Florida
